McCorquodale is a surname of Scottish origin.
The name originates from Argyll in the West Highlands.

People with the surname McCorquodale
   
British family:
 George McCorquodale (1817–1895), founder of McCorquodale printers.
 George Frederick McCorquodale (1853–1936) m. 1879 Mary Augusta Henderson, daughter of Sir Edmund Henderson.
 Alexander Cowan McCorquodale (1858–1941)
 Alexander George McCorquodale (1897–1964) m. 1927 Barbara Cartland (1901–2000)
 Raine McCorquodale (1929–2016), British socialite and stepmother of Diana, Princess of Wales, m. 1st Gerald Legge, 9th Earl of Dartmouth, m. 2nd John Spencer, 8th Earl Spencer, m. 3rd Count Jean-François Pineton de Chambrun.
 Kate McCorquodale m. 1897 Henry Horne, 1st Baron Horne (1861–1929)
 Norman McCorquodale (1863–1938) m. 1897 Constance Eleanor Burton
 Brigadier Norman McCorquodale (1898–1971) m. 1923 Barbara de Knoop
 Mary Pamela McCorquodale (born 1932) m. Michael Bowes-Lyon, 17th Earl of Strathmore and Kinghorne (1928–1987).
 Malcolm McCorquodale, 1st Baron McCorquodale (1901–1971), British politician, m. 1st Winifred Sophia Clark, m. 2nd 1962 Hon. Daisy Pearson, daughter of Weetman Pearson, 2nd Viscount Cowdray. 
 Hon. Pamela Susan McCorquodale (born 1934) m. William Forbes of Callendar
 Hon. Prudence Fiona McCorquodale (born 1936) m. Carel Maurits Mosselmans
 Captain George McCorquodale m. 1933 Hon. Charlotte Enid Lawson Johnston, daughter of George Lawson Johnston, 1st Baron Luke.
 Pamela Constance McCorquodale (1910–1944) m. Major Angus McCorquodale (1905–1940) [see below]
 Harold McCorquodale (1865–1943) m. 1893 Grace Granville
 Major Kenneth McCorquodale (1894–1976) m. 1923 Ellen Viva Martin
 Alastair McCorquodale (1925–2009), Scottish athlete and cricketer, m. Rosemary Turnor
 Sarah McCorquodale (1948–2008) m. Geoffrey van Cutsem, son of Bernard van Cutsem.
 Neil McCorquodale (born 1951) m. Lady Sarah Spencer (born 1955), elder sister of Diana, Princess of Wales.
 Emily Jane McCorquodale (born 1983) m. James Hutt
 George Edmund McCorquodale (born 1984) m. Bianca Moore
 Celia Rose McCorquodale (born 1989)
 Joan McCorquodale (born 1931) m. Bertram Bowyer, 2nd Baron Denham
 Hugh McCorquodale (1898–1963) m. 1936 Barbara Cartland (1901–2000)
 Ian McCorquodale (born 1937)
 Glen McCorquodale (born 1939)
 Colonel Donald McCorquodale (1902–1985) m. Diana Margaret Tennant
 John McCorquodale (1930–2005)
 Agnes McCorquodale (born 1934)
 Major Angus McCorquodale (1905–1940) m. Pamela Constance McCorquodale (1910–1944)
 Rona Helena McCorquodale (born 1936) m. David Lowsley-Williams 
 Colin Norman McCorquodale (born 1938)

McCorquodale in Scotland:
Charles P. McCorquodale (1948–1996), art historian and author.

McCorquodale in the United States:
Joe McCorquodale (1920–2017), American politician.
Corky McCorquodale (1904–1968), professional poker player.
Dan McCorquodale (1934- ), American politician.

Other
Baron McCorquodale, an extinct barony in the Peerage of the United Kingdom.
Clan McCorquodale, a Scottish clan.